The list of awards and honors of Katalin Karikó provides a comprehensive overview of the awards, honors, scientific degrees and other recognitions of the Hungarian-American biochemist Katalin Karikó of the University of Pennsylvania.

Katalin Karikó is credited with one of the most important scientific discoveries of the 21st century. The Messenger RNA-based technology she developed and the two most effective vaccines based on it, BioNTech/Pfizer and Moderna, laid the foundation for the effective fight against SARS-CoV-2 virus and the containment of the COVID-19 pandemic worldwide. Her discovery also holds promise for future cures for many other diseases.

In both 2021 and 2022, she was considered a potential Nobel laureate in the scientific world.

In the end, she was not awarded the prize in either year. Referring to her daughter Susan Francia, a two-time Olympic champion, she said that in science, there is no unquestionable comparison of performance like in most sports; scientists do not compete against each other like athletes do in world competitions. The awarding of a scientific prize always reflects the opinion and knowledge of the group that decides on it.

Katalin Karikó, after having received more than 110 international scientific awards and honors of outstanding international importance in less than 2 years, stressed that she tries to attend as many award ceremonies as possible in person, and to give lectures and hold meetings in connection with the ceremonies, because the news about them draws public attention to science.

"Because the honor of science must be restored," she said.

Awards and honors before 2020 

 Népköztársasági ösztöndíj  | Government of the Hungarian People's Republic | 1975 - 1978 |
 Kisújszállás városának Tiszteletbeli Polgára | Kisújszállás Önkormányzata | 2009 |

Awards and honors in 2020 

 Volkswagen Kék Innovációs Különdíj | Menedzserek Országos Szövetsége |
 Kisújszállás díszpolgára | Kisújszállás Önkormányzata |
 Közmédia Év Embere Díj | MTVA |[13]
 Research!America - Outstanding Achievement in Public Health Awards | Drew Weissman |
 Rosenstiel Award 2020 | Brandeis University | Drew Weissman |

Awards and honors in 2021 

 100 People Transforming Business | Insider |
 AAAS Fellows | American Association for the Advancement of Science |
 Albany Medical Center Prize | Albany Medical | Barney Graham, Drew Weissman |
 Princess of Asturias Award | Princess of Asturias Foundation | Drew Weissman, Philip Felgner, Uğur Şahin, Özlem Türeci, Derrick Rossi, Sarah Gilbert |
 BIAL Award in Biomedicine | BIAL Foundation | Drew Weissman |
 Bill Foege Award | MAP International | Anthony Fauci, Carlos Del Rio |
 Bolyai János alkotói díj | Bolyai-díj Alapítvány |
 Csongrád-Csanád megye díszpolgára | Csongrád-Csanád Megyei Önkormányzat |
 Debrecen Díj a Molekuláris Orvostudományért | University of Debrecen |
 Dr. Paul Janssen Award | Johnson & Johnson | Drew Weissman |
 Fodor József-díj | Hungarian Society of Hygiene |
 Forbes No.1 (entrepreneurs, leaders, scientists, creators; 50+) | Forbes |
 Frontiers Awards | BBVA Foundation, Bilbao | Drew Weissman and Robert Langer |
 German Future Prize | Federal President for Technology and Innovation | Uğur Şahin, Özlem Türeci, Christoph Huber |
 Golden Goose | National Institutes of Health, Tennessee | Drew Weissman |
 Golden Plate Award | Academy of Achievement |
 Grande Médaille | French Academy of Sciences |
 Great Immigrant Great American Award 2021 | Carnegie Corporation of New York |
 Human Dignity Award | Council of Human Dignity |
 Inventor of the Year IPOEF | Intellectual Property Owners Education Foundation | Uğur Şahin, Özlem Türeci, Drew Weissman |
 Inventors of the Year PCI | Penn Center of Innovation | Drew Weissman |
 Jedlik Ányos-díj | Hungarian Intellectual Property Office | Imre Dékány, Andrea Fekete, András Kotschy, András Szecskay |
 John J. Carlin Service Award | USRowing |
 John Scott Award | Philadelphia University | Drew Weissman |
 Keio Medical Science Prize 2021 | Keio University | Osamu Nureki |
 L'Oréal-UNESCO For Women in Science Award | UNESCO | María Guadalupe Guzmán Tirado, Hailan Hu, Agnès Binagwaho, María Ángela Nieto Toledano |
 Lasker-DeBakey Clinical Medical Research Award | Albert and Mary Lasker Foundation | Drew Weissman |
 Louisa Gross Horwitz Prize | Columbia University | Drew Weissman |
 Magyar Lélek Díj | Hungarian Magyar Club of Chicago |
 New York Academy of Medicine | New York Academy of Medicine | Drew Weissman |
 Novo Nordisk Prize | Novo Nordisk Foundation | Uğur Şahin, Özlem Türeci, Drew Weissman |
 Pioneer Award | Precision Medicine World Conference (PMWC) 2021 |
 Prima Díj | Vállalkozók és Munkáltatók Országos Szövetsége Jász-Nagykun-Szolnok Megyei Szervezete |
 Prince Mahidol Award | Prince Mahidol Award Foundation under the Royal Patronage, Bangkok | Drew Weissman, Pieter Cullis |
 Princess Marina Sturdza Award | Emerging Europe Council | Sir Suma Chakrabarti |
 Reichstein Medal | Swiss Academy of Pharmaceutical Sciences (SAPhS) |
 Semmelweis-díj | EMMI |
 Stem Cell Hero NYSCF | The New York Stem Cell Foundation | Derrick Rossi, Kizzmekia Corbett, Barney Graham, Drew Weissman |
 Straub-plakett  | Biological Research Centre (Hungarian Academy of Sciences), Szeged |
 Széchenyi Prize | Government of Hungary |
 Szeged Város Díszpolgára | Szeged Megyei Jogú Város Önkormányzata |
 Theodor Boveri Award | University of Würzburg |
 Time 100 - The 100 Most Influential People of 2021 | Time magazine |
 Time - 2021 Heroes of the Year | Time magazine | Kizzmekia Corbett, Barney Graham and Drew Weissman |
 Tudományos Prima különdíj | Jász-Nagykun-Szolnok Megye |
 VinFuture Grand Prize | VinFuture Foundation | Drew Weissman, Pieter Cullis |
 Wilhelm Exner Medal | Austrian Industrial Association | Luisa Torsi |
 William B. Coley Award for Distinguished Research in Basic and Tumor Immunology | Cancer Research Institute | Uğur Şahin, Özlem Türeci, Drew Weissman |
 Women of the Year | Glamour Magazine |

Awards and honors in 2022 

 Beacon Award of Trustees' Council of Penn Women | PennAlumni of University of Pennsylvania |
 Benjamin Franklin Medal in Life Science | The Franklin Institute of Philadelphia | Drew Weissman |
 Jessie Stevenson Kovalenko Medal | National Academy of Sciences (NAS), Washington | Drew Weissman |
 Breakthrough Prize in Life Sciences 2022 | Breakthrough Prize Foundation | Drew Weissman |
 Camurus Lipid Science Prize | Camurus Lipid Research Foundation |
 Canada Gairdner International Awards | Drew Weissman and Pieter Cullis |
 German Immunology Prize | German Society for Immunology | Uğur Şahin, Özlem Türeci |
 Emilia Chiancone Medal | Accademia Nazionale delle Scienze, Roma |
 Empowering Research and Discovery Award | National Disease Research Interchange (NDRI) | Drew Weissman |
 European Inventor Award for Lifetime achievement | European Patent Office |
 Golden Arrow | Vienna Congress com.sult 2022 | Anna Kiesenhofer |
 Harold Berger Award | Penn Engineering, University of Pennsylvania | Drew Weissman |
 Helmholtz Medal 2022 | Berlin-Brandenburg Academy of Sciences and Humanities |
 Japan Prize | Japan Prize Foundation | Drew Weissman |
 Jász-Nagykun-Szolnok Megye Díszpolgára Díj | Jász-Nagykun-Szolnok Megyei Közgyűlés |
 Louis-Jeantet Prize for Medicine | Louis-Jeantet Foundation, Geneva | Uğur Şahin, Özlem Türeci |
 Kati, we love you! prize | Kisújszállási civilek |
 Lindhal Lecture | Neurovations |
 Matis Family Investigator Award | Drs. Louis and Lyn Matis - Penn Institute for Immunology | Drew Weissman |
 Mohammed bin Rashid Al Maktoum Knowledge Award | Dubai Culture and Arts Authority | Zhang Yongzhen, Drew Weissman |
 National Inventors Hall of Fame | The United States Patent and Trademark Office & The National Inventors Hall of Fame | Drew Weissman |
 Park MahnHoon Award | International Vaccine Institute & SK bioscience | Tore Godal, Drew Weissman |
 Paul Ehrlich and Ludwig Darmstaedter Prize | The Paul Ehrlich Foundation | Uğur Şahin, Özlem Türeci |
 Pearl Meister Greengard Prize | Rockefeller University |
 Peter Speiser Award | Institute of Pharmaceutical Sciences of ETH Zurich |
 Philadelphia-Israel Chamber of Commerce Award | Philadelphia-Israel Chamber of Commerce | Drew Weissman |
 Ross Prize in Molecular Medicine | Feinstein Institute | Drew Weissman |
 SBMT Award | Society for Brain Mapping & Therapeutics |
 Solvay Prize | Solvay S.A. |
 Stanford University Drug Discovery Lifetime Achievement Award | Stanford University |
 Status List 2022 | STAT - Editor's Pick |
 Szegedért Alapítvány – Fődíj | Szegedért Alapítvány  |
 Szent-Gizella-díj | Civil Szeretet Kurázsi Társaság  |
 Tang Prize | Academia Sinica, Taiwan | Drew Weissman and Pieter Cullis |
 Vilcek Prize for Excellence in Biotechnology | Vilcek Foundation |
 Warren Alpert Prize | Harvard Medical School | Uğur Şahin, Özlem Türeci, Drew Weissman, Eric Huang |
 Werner von Siemens Ring | The Werner von Siemens Ring Foundation | Uğur Şahin, Özlem Türeci, Christoph Huber |

Honorary degrees

Honorary degrees in 2021 

 Received Doctor of Science as an honorary degree from the University of Szeged |
 Received Doctor of Science as an honorary degree from the Duke University | Drew Weissman, Ken Jeong, Mary Schmidt Campbell |
 Received Doctor of Science as an honorary degree from of the Humanitas University of Milan |

Honorary degrees 2022 

 Received Doctor of Science as an honorary degree from the Eötvös Loránd University Budapest |
 Received Doctor of Science as an honorary degree from the Radboud University |
 Received Doctor of Science as an honorary degree from the Rockefeller University | Anthony Fauci, Lulu C. Wang |
 Received Doctor of Science as an honorary degree from the Tel Aviv University | Cornelia Bargmann, Sir Michael Victor Berry, Barbara Engelking, Eric J. Gertler, James S. Gertler, Bernd Friedrich Huber, Jodi Kantor, Solomon Lew, Jehuda Reinharz, Jürgen Renn |
 Received Doctor of Science as an honorary degree from the Université libre de Bruxelles |
 Received Doctor of Science as an honorary degree from the University of Geneva | Susan M. Gasser, Susan Goldin-Meadow, Ananya Roy |
 Received Doctor of Science as an honorary degree from the Yale University| Caroline Shaw, Krista Tippett, Madeleine Albright, James Clyburn, Jill Lepore, Myron Thompson, Jean Bennett, Drew Weissman, Orlando Patterson |

Academic Memberships and fellowships

2020 

 Member | Academia Europea |

2021 

 Foreign Member | French Académie des sciences | William Timothy Gowers, Martin Hairer, Anne L'Huillier, Wolfgang Wernesdorfer, Annalisa Buffa, Yann Le Cun, Susan Brantley, Frank Eisenhauer, Sason Shaik, Nicola Spaldin, Nicole King, Alberto R. Kornblihtt, Angela Nieto, Eva H. Stukenbrock, Cédric Blanpain |
 Hawking Fellow | Cambridge Union |

2022 

 Member | German National Academy of Sciences | German National Academy of Sciences Leopoldina |
 Member | Hungarian Academy of Sciences |
 Member | National Academy of Inventors |
 Member | National Academy of Medicine – Washington |

References 

Genome editing
Lists of awards received by person
Lists of science and technology awards